A forest range is a term used to define administrative regions containing one or more (usually) demarcated and (usually) protected or resource-managed forests. The term was in use in British India, and hence India, Pakistan and Bangladesh use this term for administrative purposes.

In India

In India, the combined forests in a forest division are completely divided into non-overlapping forest ranges for the purpose of administration and coordination, in an analogous form of dividing the political area of a subdivision into blocks. Alignment of the ranges to political boundaries is not necessary, as forests often overlap political boundaries - but one range cannot span more than one state. 

Each range controls the protected areas and managed resources under its jurisdiction, and is presided over by a Forest Range Officer. A forest range may be broken up into one or more 'sub-ranges' or 'blocks'.

References

Protected areas of India
Forest administration in India
Ministry of Environment, Forest and Climate Change
Forestry in Pakistan
Forests of Bangladesh
Types of formally designated forests